Khojorni is a village in Georgia’s Kvemo Kartli region with the population of 635. It had 842 inhabitants in 2002.

References

Populated places in Marneuli Municipality